The 2003–04 LEN Euroleague was the 41st edition of LEN's premier competition for men's water polo clubs. It ran from 17 September 2003 to 29 May 2004, and it was contested by 38 teams. The Final Four (semifinals, final, and third place game) took place on May 28 and May 29 in Budapest.

Preliminary round

Group A

Group B

Group C

Group D

Knockout stage

Quarter-finals
The first legs were played on 14 April, and the second legs were played on 28 April 2004.

Final Four
Hajós Alfréd Nemzeti Sportuszoda, Budapest, Hungary.

Final standings

Awards
MVP:  Péter Biros (Bp. Honvéd)

See also
 2003–04 LEN Trophy

LEN Champions League seasons
Champions League
2003 in water polo
2004 in water polo